The 2002 Segunda División Peruana, the second division of Peruvian football (soccer), was played by 16 teams. The tournament winner, Unión Huaral was promoted to the First Division. The last places, Guardia Republicana, Lawn Tennis, and Bella Esperanza were relegated. The tournament was played on a home-and-away round-robin basis.

Results

Standings

Notes

External links
 RSSSF

Peruvian Segunda División seasons
Peru2
2002 in Peruvian football